Montarioso is a province in Tuscany, central Italy, administratively a frazione of the comune of Monteriggioni, province of Siena.

Montarioso is about 5 km from Siena and 13 km from Monteriggioni. Montarioso is often still known today as a part of Belverde. 

Transportation is available to Montarioso serviced by Autolinee Toscane

Mains sights 
 Santa Maria Maddalena a Santonovo (12th century)

References 

Frazioni of Monteriggioni